The 2006 Speedway World Cup Event 2 was the second race of the 2006 Speedway World Cup season. It took place on July 18, 2006 in the G&B Stadium in Målilla, Sweden.

Results

Heat details

References

See also 
 2006 Speedway World Cup
 Motorcycle speedway

E2